The reddish-gray musk shrew (Crocidura cyanea) is a species of mammal in the family Soricidae. It is found in Angola, Botswana, Democratic Republic of the Congo, Eswatini, Lesotho, Malawi, Mozambique, Namibia,  Nigeria, South Africa, Tanzania, Zambia, and Zimbabwe. Its natural habitats are lowland forests, subtropical or tropical high-elevation grassland, and caves.

References

Crocidura
Mammals described in 1838
Taxa named by Georges Louis Duvernoy
Taxonomy articles created by Polbot